The little Inca finch (Incaspiza watkinsi) is a species of bird traditionally placed in the family Emberizidae, but it may be more closely related to the Thraupidae. It is endemic to Peru where its natural habitat is subtropical or tropical dry shrubland. It is threatened by habitat loss.

References

Incaspiza
Endemic birds of Peru
Birds described in 1925
Taxonomy articles created by Polbot